"Any Way You Want Me" (sometimes titled  "Anyway You Want Me" and "Any Way You Want Me (That's How I Will Be)") is a song written by Aaron Schroeder and Cliff Owens and originally recorded and released by Elvis Presley.

Presley's recording reached number one on the U.S. Billboards Most Played in Jukeboxes chart (as a double A-side with "Love Me Tender").

Composition 
The song was written by Aaron Schroeder and Cliff Owens.

Recording 
Elvis Presley recorded the song on July 2, 1956, at RCA Studios in New York. According to the Elvis Presley official website, the recording features Elvis' regular sidemen Scotty Moore on guitar, Bill Black on bass, and D. J. Fontana on drums. Presley plays guitar as well as sings. Shorty Long is on piano. Additional vocals are provided by The Jordanaires.

Track listing

Charts

References

External links 
 
 
 Any Way You Want Me (That's How I Will Be) (EP) on the Elvis Presley official website

1956 songs
1956 singles
Elvis Presley songs
Songs written by Aaron Schroeder